The 2020–21 season was the 88th season in the existence of FC Red Bull Salzburg and the club's 32nd consecutive season in the top flight of Austrian football. They were the defending Austrian League and Austrian Cup champions. The season covered the period from 1 July 2020 until 30 June 2021.

Season events
On 29 June, Alexander Walke signed a new one-year contract with the club.

On 8 July, Hwang Hee-chan moved from Red Bull Salzburg to RB Leipzig.

On 10 July, Red Bull Salzburg terminated their contract with Abdourahmane Barry.

On 13 July, Red Bull Salzburg announced the signing of Federico Crescenti from St. Gallen.

On 15 July, Luka Sučić signed a new contract with Red Bull Salzburg, until the summer of 2024.

On 16 July, Red Bull Salzburg announced the signing of Samson Tijani from Collins Edwin on a contract until 31 May 2025.

On 17 July, Amar Dedić signed a new contract with Red Bull Salzburg until 30 June 2024.

On 19 July, Red Bull Salzburg announced the signing of Oumar Solet on a five-year contract from Olympique Lyonnais.

On 27 July, Kim Jung-min left Red Bull Salzburg to join Vitória de Guimarães.

On 29 July, Philipp Köhn joined FC Wil on loan for the season.

On 11 August, Samuel Tetteh joined New York Red Bulls on loan until the end of 2020, whilst Darko Todorović joined Hajduk Split on a season-long loan deal the follow day, and Samson Tijani joined on TSV Hartberg on a similar deal on 13 August.

On 15 August, Alexander Schmidt left Red Bull Salzburg to sign for LASK.

On 17 August, Kilian Ludewig's loan deal at Barnsley was extended for the 2020–21 season.

On 26 August, Peter Pokorný joined SKN St. Pölten on a season-long loan deal.

On 28 August, Red Bull Salzburg's Austrian Cup match against Bregenz, scheduled for 29 August, was postponed after one of the Bregenz players tested positive for COVID-19.

On 31 August, Smail Prevljak left Red Bull Salzburg to sign permanently for KAS Eupen.

On 1 September, Luca Meisl left Red Bull Salzburg to sign permanently for SV Ried, whilst Gideon Mensah moved to Vitória de Guimarães on a season-long loan deal with the option to make the move permanent.

On 3 September, Red Bull Salzburg announced the signing of Mamadou Sangare to a five-year contract from Yeelen Olympique, whilst their Austrian Cup game against SC Bregenz was confirmed for 20:45 on 9 September.

On 5 October, Kilian Ludewig had his loan deal with Barnsley terminated, and was sent on loan to Schalke 04 for the season.

On 6 October, Albert Vallci extended his contract with Red Bull Salzburg until the summer of 2024. On 10 October, Chukwubuike Adamu extended his contract with Red Bull Salzburg until the summer of 2025.

On 16 October, Red Bull Salzburg announced the signing of Brenden Aaronson from Philadelphia Union on a contract until the summer of 2025, with Aaronson joining up with Salzburg over the winter break.

On 17 December, Dominik Szoboszlai was sold to RB Leipzig for an undisclosed amount. The Following day, 18 December, Zlatko Junuzović extended his contract with Red Bull Salzburg until 30 June 2022.

On 22 December, Red Bull Salzburg announced that Mali Internationals, Mohamed Camara and Sékou Koïta had tested positive for a banned substance following their recent International break.

On 4 January, Red Bull Salzburg announced the signings of Mamady Diambou, Nene Dorgeles and Daouda Guindo from Guidars FC, all on contracts until May 2025.

On 13 January, Red Bull Salzburg announced that Majeed Ashimeru had joined RSC Anderlecht on loan for the rest of the season, whilst Jérôme Onguéné moved to Genoa on a similar deal on 15 January.

On 18 January, Hungarian winger Csaba Bukta joined Rheindorf Altach on loan for the remainder of the season.

The next day, 19 January, Red Bull Salzburg sent Samuel Tetteh on loan to SKN St. Pölten, and re-signed Bernardo on loan from Brighton & Hove Albion for the remainder of the season.

On 20 January, Red Bull Salzburg announced the signing of Lucho from AAF Popayán, before sending him out on loan to SV Horn the following day. On 26 January, Red Bull Salzburg announced the signing of Rocco Zikovic from NK Istra on a contract until May 2023.

On 28 January, Daniel Antosch joined SV Horn on loan for the remainder of the season, whilst Nico Mantl joined from SpVgg Unterhaching on a contract until July 2025.

On 31 January Masaya Okugawa joined Arminia Bielefeld on loan for the remainder of the season, with Red Bull Salzburg announcing the signing of Kamil Piątkowski from Raków Częstochowa on a contract running to June 2026, with the defender joining in the summer transfer window.

On 8 February, Red Bull Salzburg announced the signing of Forson Amankwah and Daniel Owusu from West African Football Academy, with Owusu joining SV Horn on loan for the remainder of the season.

On 26 February, goalkeeper Carlos Miguel joined New York Red Bulls on loan until 31 December 2021, with Youba Diarra also joining New York Red Bulls on loan until 31 December 2021 on 1 March.

On 21 May, Alexander Walke signed a new one-year contract with Red Bull Salzburg, keeping him at the club until the summer of 2022.

Squad

Out on loan

Coaching staff

Kits

Transfers

In

 Aaronson's move was announced on the above date, but was not finalised until 1 January 2021.
 Piątkowski's move was announced on the above date, but was not finalised until 1 July 2021.

Loans in

Out

 Szoboszlai's move was announced on the above date, but was not finalised until 1 January 2021.

Loans out

Released

Friendlies

Competitions

Overview

Bundesliga

Regular stage

League table

Results summary

Results by round

Results

Championship stage

Results summary

Results by round

Results

League table

Austrian Cup

UEFA Champions League

Qualifying rounds

Group stage

UEFA Europa League

Knockout phase

Statistics

Appearances and goals

|-
|colspan="14"|Players also registered for Liefering :
|-
|colspan="14"|Players away on loan :

|-
|colspan="14"|Players who left Red Bull Salzburg during the season:

|}

Goalscorers

Clean Sheets

Disciplinary Record

References

FC Red Bull Salzburg seasons
Red Bull Salzburg
Red Bull Salzburg
Austrian football championship-winning seasons